is the twenty-fifth single by Japanese artist Masaharu Fukuyama. It was released on 16 December 2009.  has a tied in with Toshiba Regza Fall/Winter CM. "On and On 09'" is the re-worked version of "On and On," which was performed in Mischishirube 20th Anniversary Tour.  is an instrumental piece used in Dunlop CM. This single was released in three versions- Limited Edition T-shirt, (designed by Lily Franky), Limited Edition DVD (which includes the PV for Hatsukoi) and Normal Edition. Fukuyama decided to release "Hatsukoi" as a single due to the public demands. He also performed the song in NHK's Kōhaku Uta Gassen, live via satellite from Glover Garden in Nagasaki.

Track listing

CD
 (First Love)
On and On 09 
 (Dreams of Ammonite)
 (original karaoke)
On and On 09 (original karaoke)

Limited Edition DVD
 (Music Clip)

Charts

References

2009 singles
Billboard Japan Hot 100 number-one singles
Masaharu Fukuyama songs
Oricon Weekly number-one singles
RIAJ Digital Track Chart number-one singles
2009 songs